Stratos Garozis (born 10 October 1976) is a Greek former professional footballer who played as a midfielder.

References

1976 births
Living people
Greek footballers
Kalamata F.C. players
PAS Giannina F.C. players
A.P.O. Akratitos Ano Liosia players
A.O. Kerkyra players
Messiniakos F.C. players
Pierikos F.C. players
Trikala F.C. players
Pyrsos Grevena F.C. players
Doxa Kranoula F.C. players
Thesprotos F.C. players
Super League Greece players
Association football midfielders
Footballers from Ioannina